Jamar Butler (born September 27, 1985) is a basketball point guard. His career started at Shawnee High School in Lima, Ohio, where he was named Ohio's Mr. Basketball his senior year. Butler was then recruited by both the University of Cincinnati and Ohio State University. Jamar chose Ohio State, where he broke multiple school records while majoring in African American and African Studies.

Early career
Butler attended Shawnee High School in Lima, Ohio, and scored a total of 2,412 points throughout his high school career. He placed tenth on Ohio's all-time scoring list. In his senior year, Butler averaged 31.6 points a game, 8.3 assists, 5.8 rebounds, and 2.6 steals a game, and he was named Ohio's Mr. Basketball of 2004. Butler was honored for his Mr. Basketball honor on January 14, 2011 at a varsity game vs. Elida High School. Jamar was Lima's 4th Mr. Basketball in Ohio winner, the others, Greg Simpson (twice) and Aaron Hutchins.

As a sophomore, Butler averaged 10.1 points per game and was named Big Ten Player of the Week in February 2006 after leading Ohio State to wins against two ranked opponents. He also led the team in foul shots, with an accuracy rate of about eighty percent. As a junior, Butler scored 18 points in the first game of the season and did so again against Penn State. He played for thirty minutes or more in twenty-eight of Ohio State's thirty-nine games.

As a senior, Butler helped lead Ohio State to victory in the 2008 National Invitation Tournament

Butler set the career records in assists (579) and games played (139) at Ohio State. (His assists record has since been eclipsed by Aaron Craft.) He is also twenty-third all-time in scoring, with 1,313 points.

References

1985 births
Living people
American expatriate basketball people in Bosnia and Herzegovina
American expatriate basketball people in Cyprus
American expatriate basketball people in Germany
American expatriate basketball people in Greece
American expatriate basketball people in Italy
American expatriate basketball people in Turkey
Basketball players from Ohio
Eisbären Bremerhaven players
Greek Basket League players
KK Igokea players
Ohio State Buckeyes men's basketball players
Olympia Larissa B.C. players
Piratas de Quebradillas players
Point guards
American men's basketball players